Puerto Iguazú is a border city in the province of Misiones, Argentina. With a population of 82,227,
it is the fourth largest city in the Province, after Posadas, Oberá, and Eldorado.

History 

Spanish explorer Álvar Núñez Cabeza de Vaca became, in 1542, the first European to discover what are now called Iguazú Falls. He was drawn by the noise of the water, which can be heard at a distance of several kilometers. When the Spanish arrived in the 16th century, the Guaraní people were the principal inhabitants of the area.

Despite its early exploration, the area remained occupied only by the Guaraní Indians until 1880.  Corrientes Province, which at that time included what is now Misiones, sold 50 square leagues at the current site of Puerto Iguazú near the falls in 1881. The land changed hands three times in the course of just two years, and ended up as the property of Gregorio Lezama. At that time Misiones separated from Corrientes. Lezama funded a scientific expedition to explore the territory, enlisting Carlos Bosetti and Jordan Hummel for that purpose. Those two explorers later organized the first tourist trip to the falls; Lezama sold the land in 1888 to Martín Errecaborde and Company.

Territorial Governor Rudecindo Roca established Iguazú Department, one of 5 initial subdivisions in Misiones, in 1882. A Justice of the Peace, Alberto Mujica, was assigned to the area in 1897. The firm of Gibaja y Núñez opened the town's first hotel at this time to serve the growing numbers of tourists visiting Iguazú Falls. One of these, Victoria Aguirre, funded the first road into the town in 1901 as well as other civic improvements, and it was in her honor that on September 10, 1902, the settlement was formally established as Puerto Aguirre. A police department (1913), a civil registrar (1916), and a post office (1928) followed.

The Iguazú National Park was established as such by the national government in 1934, and in 1943 the town was renamed Puerto Iguazú. The Tancredo Neves Bridge, connecting the city with neighboring Foz do Iguaçu (Brazil), was opened in 1985.

Climate 

Puerto Iguazú has a Humid Subtropical climate (Cfa according to Köppen climate classification). Temperatures are warm in winter and hot in summer. Precipitation falls mostly during convective storms. Due to abundant rainfall, rainforests surrounds Puerto Iguazú.

Thunderstorms with heavy rains bring relief when the heat becomes too intense.
Frost is rare but does occur on some winters, and temperatures within a few degrees of freezing occur every winter.

Temperatures above  have been recorded in the spring and summer.

Economy 

The economy is centered around tourism, given that the city's many hotels provide the principal source of jobs for its inhabitants. Many international hotels have been and are being constructed along the banks of the Iguazú River.

Other of the city's tourist attractions include Three Frontiers, where the Argentine, Paraguayan and Brazilian borders meet. Puerto Iguazú is home to an active community of artisans, the La Aripuca resort, the Museum of Images of the Jungle (a collection of woodcarvings), the Mbororé Museum, the Luis Honorio Rolón Municipal Nature Park, the Güira Oga Center for Bird Rehabilitation, the Hotel Esturión, the Iguazú Grand Hotel and Casino, the Amérian Portal del Iguazú, and, south of Puerto Iguazú, the Sheraton Iguazú Resort & Spa.

The nearby Wanda Mines also attract gemstone and geode collectors. Operating since the 1950s, the mines are the site of some of Argentina's best agate, amethyst, quartz and topaz lodes.

Transport 

The Tancredo Neves International Bridge links Puerto Iguazú with the Brazilian border town of Foz do Iguaçu, where the Argentine National Route 12 becomes the Brazilian BR-469. From the main bus station one can take taxis, or the municipal bus, one of whose routes run from the Three Frontiers to Iguazú National Park (Parque Nacional de las Cataratas).

The city is served by its own international airport, Cataratas del Iguazú International Airport, as well as by Foz do Iguaçu International Airport on the Brazilian side of the border.

Ecology 

The municipality contains the  Iguazú National Reserve, created in 1970.
One of the last remnants of the Atlantic Forest remains in and around the Iguazu Falls. This is a subtropical forest with native bamboos and a rich diversity of birds including toucans and hummingbirds. Coatis are accustomed to begging for food from park visitors. Most of the streets of Puerto Iguazu are unmetalled, red dirt, with gutters on either side (canalitos) that have grassy banks in which eels and a variety of freshwater fish, including knifefish (gymnotus) and catfish, inhabit. The canals drain into the Paraná River.

Sister cities 
  Ciudad del Este, Paraguay
  Presidente Franco, Paraguay

See also 

 Three Frontiers
 Fraternity Bridge

References

External links 

 
 Iguazu Water Falls Information and Travel Argentina
 Turismo en Puerto Iguazú

Populated places in Misiones Province
Populated places established in 1902
Argentina–Brazil border crossings
Argentina–Paraguay border
Cities in Argentina
Argentina
Misiones Province